These are the official results of the Men's 1,500 metres event at the 1987 IAAF World Championships in Rome, Italy. There were a total of 39 participating athletes, with three qualifying heats, two semi-finals and the final held on Sunday 1987-09-06.

Medalists

Final

Semi-finals
Held on Friday 1987-09-04

Qualifying heats
Held on Thursday 1987-09-03

See also
 1983 Men's World Championships 1,500 metres (Helsinki)
 1984 Men's Olympic 1,500 metres (Los Angeles)
 1986 Men's European Championships 1,500 metres (Stuttgart)
 1988 Men's Olympic 1,500 metres (Seoul)
 1990 Men's European Championships 1,500 metres (Split)
 1991 Men's World Championships 1,500 metres (Tokyo)

References
 Results
 Results - World Athletics

 
1500 metres at the World Athletics Championships